Zuckschwerdt is a German surname. Notable people with the surname include:

Adalbert Zuckschwerdt (1874–1945), German military officer
Wolfgang Zuckschwerdt (born 1949), German judo athlete

German-language surnames